Moor's Charity School was founded in 1754 in Lebanon, Connecticut (now in the town of Columbia), by the Puritan Calvinist minister Eleazar Wheelock to provide education for Native Americans who desired to be missionaries to the native tribes.

Eleazar Wheelock became involved in education when Samson Occom, a Mohegan Native American, asked Rev. Wheelock for instruction. The English School with teacher Eleazar Wheelock and just one Native student, Samson Occom, transformed into Moor's Indian Charity School. From 1750 to the early 1770s forty-nine Native American boys and eighteen Native American girls were educated at the school.

Between 1766 and 1768, Occom went on a fundraising tour of Britain to raise money for the school. The fundraising effort was extremely successful, raising 12,000 pounds in donations. Rev. Wheelock took the fundraising money, moved the school's location, and used the money to eventually build Dartmouth School. Controversy existed with this action. Samson Occom charged, "All the money has done is, it has made Doctor's [Wheelock] family very grand in the World."

The school survived for only a fairly short time, as Connecticut was located far from Native American territories on the frontier of the British colonies in North America, and because Wheelock desired to expand the institution to include a school for Europeans. The institution was moved to New Hampshire in 1770, where it was re-established as Dartmouth College.

References

External links
 Historic Buildings of Connecticut

Defunct schools in Connecticut
Dartmouth College history
Native American schools
1754 establishments in Connecticut
Lebanon, Connecticut